13th Street (TV channel) is a European and Australian television channel featuring action and suspense programming.

13th Street may also refer to:

Television
13th Street (Australian TV channel)
13th Street (German TV channel)
13ème Rue (French TV channel), the French version of 13th Street.
Calle 13 (Spanish TV channel), the Spanish version of 13th Street.

Places in the United States
13th Street (Manhattan), a street in Manhattan, New York City
13th Street (Omaha), a street in Omaha, Nebraska
13th Street (St. Louis), a street in St. Louis, Missouri
13th Street (Sacramento RT), a Sacramento RT light rail station in Sacramento, California
13th Street (SEPTA station), a SEPTA rapid transit station in Philadelphia, Pennsylvania

See also 
13th Avenue (disambiguation)